Archana Bhargava was the chairperson of United Bank of India.

Career
Archana Bhargava was the ED of Canara Bank in 2011 and the Chairman-cum-Managing Director of United Bank of India (UBI) in 2013. She has been allegedly involved in corruption.

References

Indian bankers
Living people
Year of birth missing (living people)
Indian women bankers